The Vizhaikha is a river in Perm Krai, Russia, a right tributary of the Kolva, which in turn is a tributary of the Vishera.

References 

Rivers of Perm Krai